This is a list of adult fiction books that topped The New York Times Fiction Best Seller list in 1946. The most popular title was The Hucksters which spent much of the latter half of the year (19 weeks) at the top of the list and a total of 35 weeks among the top 15. During its reign at the top, it was challenged, but never toppled, by two recognized classics, George Orwell's Animal Farm and Robert Penn Warren's All the King's Men, neither of which ever reached the top spot.

See also
 Publishers Weekly list of bestselling novels in the United States in the 1940s

References

1946
.
1946 in the United States